Ukkulankulam (official designation 214E Vavuniya South), (Tamil: உக்குளாங்குளம் , romanized: Ukkuḷāṅkuḷam; Sinhala: උකුලංගුලම්, romanized: ukulaṁgulam) is a suburb of Vavuniya in northern Sri Lanka. Ukkulankulam was a part of Pandarikulam during the reign of the Vanni king. Today there are two different villages but administratively the two are one and the same. However there are separate local council members.

Etymology 

The name of the village is derived from the presence of the Sri Lankan spotted chevrotain, known as Ukkiḻāṉ, in the area.

Location 
It is bordered to the north and east by Pandarikulam, to the west by Kurumankadu, and to the south by Koomankulam.

Historical sites 

The Shiva Lingam found in the Ukkulankulam Shiva Temple is the only 5-faced Shiva Lingam in Sri Lanka. The sanctum sanctorum of the temple is similar to that of the Kasi Vishwanathar Temple Of India.

Education 
 Kanara Pre-School

Reference

See also
List of towns in Northern Province, Sri Lanka

External links

Villages in Northern Province, Sri Lanka
Populated places in Vavuniya District